Dom Anscar Chupungco, O.S.B., STD (10 November 1939 - 9 January 2013) was a Filipino Benedictine monk, who was a noted liturgist, theologian and a mentor to all Filipino liturgists and countless students of the Pontifical Atheneum of St. Anselm in Rome and San Beda University in Manila. He was known for integrating local customs and traditions into the Catholic Mass.

Biography
Chupungco was born Herminio Javier Chupungco in Cainta, Rizal, to Estanislao Santo Tomas Chupungco and Dominga Javier. He became a monk of the Abbey of Our Lady of Montserrat in Manila in 1958 at the age of 19, at which time he was given the religious name of Anscar (Ansgar) after a great Benedictine missionary saint of the 9th century. He was ordained a priest in 1965. He earned his licentiate in philosophy and theology (both magna cum laude) from the University of Santo Tomas in Manila and his doctorate in Sacred Theology, specializing in liturgy, from the Pontifical Atheneum of St. Anselm, learning from the scholars in the field who had served as periti (expert consultants) during the Second Vatican Council.

Work
Chupungco became a member of the faculty of the Pontifical Institute of Sacred Liturgy in Rome in 1973, the first Filipino to teach there.. He was later chosen as the President of the Institute and Rector Magnificus of the Atheneum. He also established the Paul VI Institute of Liturgy in the Philippines in conjunction with the Bishop of Malaybalay (later Archbishop of Manila and cardinal), Gaudencio Rosales. This faculty was to serve as a center for forming liturgists to serve throughout Asia. He was also one of the co-founders of the Maryhill School of Theology, together with four priests from the Missionary Fathers of the Immaculate Heart.

As a leading expert in liturgy, Chupungco's expertise was sought in all parts of the world. He also produced the Handbook for Liturgical Studies, which is the standard set of textbooks for liturgical education in the world. He was a board member of the Congregation for Divine Worship and the Discipline of the Sacraments in Rome.

In 2011 he was awarded the prestigious McManus Award by the Federation of Diocesan Liturgical Commissions of the United States. He was a member of the International Commission on English in the Liturgy during the time it produced the first English language translation of the Roman Missal for use around the world.

Later years
In his last years, Chupungco occupied himself with liturgical formation at Paul VI Institute of Liturgy and speaking engagements all over the world. Speaking of recent changes in the liturgical texts mandated by the Holy See, he commented in an address in October 2011 that:

[Liturgical reform] "is being put to task by a movement known as the "reform of the reform". It carries an agenda that can have a regrettable impact on the liturgical gains of the council.

Dark clouds are forming ominously on the western horizon. They move hurriedly and decisively toward the direction of the sun that burns radiantly in the sky. They cast upon it their somber shadows to hide it from view. Suddenly it is dusk before the appointed time.

In reality however the dimness is caused by the passing clouds. I am confident that these cannot put the clock back to yesterday's evening hours.

Death
Chupungco died from a heart attack on 9 January 2013, at the Paul VI Institute of Liturgy in Malaybalay.He had been scheduled to receive the Pro Ecclesia et Pontifice Award from Pope Benedict XVI in a few weeks, to honor him for his decades of service to the Church. His body was to be returned to his abbey for burial.

See also
 Catholic Church in the Philippines
 Culture of the Philippines
 Hispanic culture in The Philippines

References

1939 births
2013 deaths
People from Cainta
Filipino Benedictines
Benedictine scholars
University of Santo Tomas alumni
Pontifical Atheneum of St. Anselm alumni
Liturgists
Filipino Roman Catholic theologians
20th-century Filipino Roman Catholic priests
21st-century Filipino Roman Catholic priests
Academic staff of the Pontifical Atheneum of St. Anselm